The Auxiliary ship replacement program is set to replace ten auxiliary ships of the Royal Netherlands Navy from various classes by eight new ships which will be built by a Dutch shipyard.

History 
In 2020 the A-letter was send by the Dutch Defence Materiel Administration (DMO) to the House of Representatives outlining the plans for the new ships. The program will consists of two variants, a coastal variant and an ocean going one. The first ship was supposed to enter service in 2024. But due to delays in the decision making this was pushed back.
The B-letter followed in June 2022 specifying further details. For example that the ships need to be carbon neutral and that they need to be able to use methanol capable diesel engines.
The new vessels are planned along the lines of the commercial off-the-shelf concept. In 2024 the builder will be announced in the D-letter, following a RfQ which will be sent out in 2023.

In February 2023 it was revealed that three major shipyards are interested in the project. These yards are the Damen Group, Royal IHC & Thecla Bodewes. Two smaller shipyards are also rumored to be interested in the program, but possible only for the building of the coastal version. These yards are Holland Shipyards & Neptune Marine.

Ocean going
The sea going variant will replace the five larger vessels:

Coastal
The coastal variant will replace the five smaller vessels:

See also 
 Future of the Royal Netherlands Navy

References 

Royal Netherlands Navy
Proposed ships of the Royal Netherlands Navy
Military acquisition
Military planning